Syngas fermentation, also known as synthesis gas fermentation, is a microbial process.  In this process, a mixture of hydrogen, carbon monoxide, and carbon dioxide, known as syngas, is used as carbon and energy sources, and then converted into fuel and chemicals by microorganisms.

The main products of syngas fermentation include ethanol, butanol, acetic acid, butyric acid, and methane.
Certain industrial processes, such as petroleum refining, steel milling, and methods for producing carbon black, coke, ammonia, and methanol, discharge enormous amounts of waste gases containing mainly CO and  into the atmosphere either directly or through combustion. Biocatalysts can be exploited to convert these waste gases to chemicals and fuels as, for example, ethanol. 

There are several microorganisms, which can produce fuels and chemicals by syngas utilization. These microorganisms are mostly known as acetogens including Clostridium ljungdahlii, Clostridium autoethanogenum, Eubacterium limosum, Clostridium carboxidivorans P7, Peptostreptococcus productus, and Butyribacterium methylotrophicum. Most use the Wood–Ljungdahl pathway.

On the other hand, syngas fermentation has limitations such as:
 Gas-liquid mass transfer limitation
 Low volumetric productivity
 Inhibition of organisms.

References

Environmental science